The Quid was a Canadian garage rock band from Winnipeg, Manitoba, active during the 1960s and 1970s.

History
The Quid was formed in 1964 in Winnipeg by musicians who were performing at the Twilight teen club.  The original band members included  Ron Rene, Bill Pavlik, Colin Palmer, Al Johnson and Morley Nickles. Their single "Lover, Lover" charted on the Canadian Top 100. They were the featured band on the compilation album Winnipeg 1965–66.

Johnson left the band and was replaced by Lenny Fidkalo.

In 1966 the band released a single, "Crazy Things", on Eagle Records. It was included as a bonus track on the CD reissue of the early garage rock compilation album Pebbles, Volume 2.

A 1980s concert in Winnipeg called "Shakin' All Over" brought the Quid together with other notable acts from the Winnipeg scene, including Neil Young, Randy Bachman, C. F. "Fred" Turner of Bachman Turner Overdrive (BTO) and Burton Cummings of the Guess Who.  Later in the decade, after Rene left the band, the others recruited singer Bobby Barton, but soon disbanded.

In the fall of 2007, Ron Rene (real name Ron Kreshka) died in Vancouver of a heart attack.

References

Musical groups from Winnipeg
Musical groups established in 1964

Canadian garage rock groups
1964 establishments in Manitoba
Musical groups with year of disestablishment missing